Waldron Cutting is a  geological Site of Special Scientific Interest  in East Sussex. It is a Geological Conservation Review site.

This site exposes siltstones and fine sandstone of the Ashdown Formation, dating to the Early Cretaceous between 140 and 100 million years ago. It has one metre long fossils of Lycopodites plants in life position.

This very small site is on both sides of a public road.

References

Sites of Special Scientific Interest in East Sussex
Geological Conservation Review sites